This is a list of women translators of literature.

A
 Mana Aghaee
 Catharina Ahlgren (1734–c.1800)
 Francesca Alexander (1837–1917)
 Acija Alfirević
 Esther Allen
 Selma Ancira – winner, Read Russia Prize 2016
 Alison Anderson
 Anne Milano Appel
 Sarah Ardizzone
 Sarah Austin (1793–1867)
 Oana Avasilichioaei
 Florence Ayscough (c.1878–1942)

B
 Constance Bache (1846–1903)
 Michelle Bailat-Jones
 Anna Banti (1895–1985)
 Gili Bar-Hillel
 Polly Barton
 Anthea Bell (1936–2018) 
 Clara Bell (1835–1927)
 Aphra Behn (1640–1689)
 Susan Bernofsky
 Magda Bogin
 Marilyn Booth
 Mary Louise Booth (1831–1889)
 Antonina W. Bouis
 Lisa Rose Bradford
 Barbara Bray (1924–2010)
 Erin Brightwell
 Dorothy Britton (1922–2015)
 Natascha Bruce
 Shelly Bryant
 Dorothy Bussy (1865–1960)

C
 Jen Calleja
 Zenobia Camprubí (1887–1956) 
 Hélène Cardona
 Nancy Naomi Carlson
 Juliet Winters Carpenter
 Lisa Carter
 Gigi Chang
 Allison M. Charette
 Anna Gustafsson Chen
 Chi Pang-yuan
 Yukie Chiri (1903–1922)
 Rohini Chowdhury
 Laura Christenson
 Heather Cleary
 Lyn Coffin
 Jessica Cohen
 Anne Coldefy-Faucard – winner, Read Russia Prize 2018
 Charlotte Collins
 Charlotte Coombe
 Nina Cornyetz
 Margaret Jull Costa
 Patricia Crampton (1925–2016)
 Victoria Cribb
 Jennifer Croft
 Susan Curtis

D
 Anne Dacier (1654–1720)
 Dai Congrong
 Simin Daneshvar (1921–2012)
 Lydia Davis
 Sarah Death
 Katy Derbyshire
 Katrina Dodson
 Adélaïde Dufrénoy (1765–1825)
 Nurduran Duman
 Marta Dziurosz

E
 Ellen Elias-Bursac
 Karen Emmerich
 Maria Espinosa

F
 Marcia Falk
 Elaine Feinstein (1930–2019)
 Annie Finch
 Sheila Fischman
 Carolyn Forché
 Maureen Freely
 Shelley Frisch

G
 Amaia Gabantxo
 Linda Gaboriau
 Ann Gagliardi
 Constance Garnett (1861–1946)
 Sylvie Gentil (1958–2017)
 Anna Gerasimova
 Svetlana Geier
 María José Giménez
 Barbara Godard (1942–2010)
 Leah Goldberg (1911–1970)
 Ann Goldstein
 Eleanor Goodman
 Luise Gottsched (1713–1762)
 Lucia Graves
 Edith Grossman
 Katia Grubisic
 Lady Charlotte Guest (1812–1895)

H
 Marilyn Hacker
 Sonya Haddad (1936–2004)
 Ivana Hadži-Popović
 Hala Halim
 Geraldine Harcourt (1952-2019)
 Choman Hardi
 Nicky Harman
 Michelle Hartman
 Rosalind Harvey
 Celia Hawkesworth
 Lisa Hayden - Read Russia Prize 2016
 Matilda Hays (1820–1897)
 Hélène Henry-Safier – winner, Read Russia Prize 2012
 Mary Herbert (1561–1621)
 Rachel Hildebrandt
 Cathy Hirano
 Mary Hobson
 Lakshmi Holmstrom (1935–2016) 
 Anna Holmwood
 Amanda Hopkinson
 Penny Hueston
 Sophie Hughes
 Anna Hume (c.1600–c.1650)
 Adriana Hunter

I
 Jane Ingham (18971982)
 Anne Ishii

J
 Carol Brown Janeway (1944– 2015)
 Elisabeth Jaquette
 Katrine Øgaard Jensen
 Chenxin Jiang
 Constance Jones (1848–1922)
 Kira Josefsson
 Margaret Jull Costa

K
 Hilary Kaplan
 Ruth Ahmedzai Kemp
 Sara Khalili
 Esther Kinsky
 Rachel Klein
 Patricia Klobusiczky
 Tina Kover

L
 Jhumpa Lahiri
 Maria Laina
 Rika Lesser
 Suzanne Jill Levine
 Tess Lewis
 Sylvia Li-chun Lin
 Janet Limonard
 Andrea Lingenfelter
 Antonia Lloyd-Jones
 Julia Lovell
 Helen Tracy Lowe-Porter (1876–1963)
 Jane Lumley, Baroness Lumley (1537–1587)
 Joyce Lussu (1912–1998)

M
 Christina MacSweeney
 Charlotte Mandell
 Emma Manley
 Canan Marasligil
 Linda Marianello
 Farzana Marie
 Maria Mercè Marçal (1952–1998)
 Sophie Maríñez
 Ruth Martin
 Lyn Marven
 Eleanor Marx (1855–1898)
 Melanie Mauthner
 Bonnie McDougall
 Megan McDowell
 Nanette McGuinness
 Anne McLean
 Erica Mena
 Inga Michaeli
 Zdravka Mihaylova
 Diana Mitford (1910–2003)
 Mihaela Moscaliuc
 Erín Moure
 Luisetta Mudie
 Ottilie Mulzet
 Robin Myers

N
 Irina Negrea
 Marilyn Nelson
 Mary Ann Newman
 Lucy North
 Sara Nović
 Tiina Nunnally

O
 Patricia Oliver
 Yei Theodora Ozaki (1871–1932)

P
 Helena Janina Pajzderska (1862–1927)
 Ève Paul-Margueritte (1885-1971)
 Lucie Paul-Margueritte (1886-1955)
 Charlotte Payne-Townshend (1857–1943)
 Fernanda Pivano (1917–2009)
 Agnieszka Pokojska
 Allison Markin Powell
 Marie Ponsot (1921–2019) 
 Alta Price
 Minna Zallman Proctor

Q
 Isabel Quigly

R
 Emma Ramadan
 Bhargavi Rao (1944–2008)
 Maruxa Relaño
 Famida Riaz
 Chloe Garcia Roberts
 Nancy N. Roberts
 Angela Rodel
 Lola Rogers
 Louise Rogers Lalaurie
 Margaret Roper (1505–1544)
 Olivia Rossetti Agresti (1875–1960)

S
 Marta Sánchez-Nieves – winner, Read Russia Prize, 2018
 Elvira Sastre
 Dorothy L. Sayers (1893–1957)
 Claudia Scandura – winner, Read Russia Prize 2016
 Samantha Schnee
 Marian Schwartz – winner, Read Russia Prize 2014
 Ros Schwartz
 Gail Scott
 Jamie Lee Searle
 Kyoko Selden (1936-2013)
 Danica Seleskovitch (1921–2001)
 Nava Semel (1954–2017)
 Yvette Siegert
 Sirindhorn
 Maj Sjöwall (1935–2020)
 Rachael Small
 Nicky Smalley
 Deborah Smith
 Hilde Spiel (1911–1990)
 Louise Swanton-Belloc (1796–1881)
 Anna Swanwick (1813–1899)
 Cole Swensen
 Fiona Sze-Lorrain

T
 Corine Tachtiris
 Niloufar Talebi
 Ginny Tapley Takemori
 Martha Tennent 
 Dorothea Tieck (1799–1841)
 Margaret Tyler (c.1540–c.1590)

U
 Avery Fischer Udagawa

V
 Leila Vennewitz (1912–2007)
 Evangelina Vigil-Piñón
 Laima Vince
 Saskia Vogel

W
 Wangui wa Goro 
 Helen Wang
 Rachel Ward
 Alyson Waters
 Laura Watkinson
 Charlotte Whittle
 Susan Wicks
 Sian Williams
 Emily Wilson
 Natasha Wimmer 
 Celina Wieniewska
 Sholeh Wolpé
 Frances Wood
 Barbara Wright (1915–2009)

Y
 Gladys Yang

Z
 Aniela Zagórska (1881–1943)
 Beryl de Zoete (1879–1962)

See also
 List of translators
 Indian women translators
 Women in Translation: An Interview with Margaret Carson & Alta L. Price

References

External links
 Some famous women translators of the past - by Marie Lebert

Literary translators
translators, women
Translation-related lists